Gustavo "Gus" Cerro (born 17 July 1969 in Rosario, Argentina), is an Argentinian-born former Australian footballer. Son of a former Newell's Old Boys player, the former creative midfielder played over 200 matches in the old Australian National Soccer League. He also played in Malaysia for Pahang and Negeri Sembilan.

Selected for Australia's U16 national team playing in the World Youth Cup in China, he grew up in Canberra.

First debuting for Canberra City in the National Youth League at age 15, Cerro moved to Sydney and joined Parramatta Melita Eagles in 1989 under manager Raúl Blanco after a year out with injury. Thankfully his ankle injury was treated by Socceroos medic Dr Siri Kannangara. In season 1991, Cerro became a fan favourite at Melita playing alongside former Argentine first division player Alfredo Barrios, Gabriel Méndez, Hugo Giménez, Greg Brown, Marshall Soper and former Copa America-winning Uruguay defender Washington González. Winning the 1990–91 NSL Cup. In fact, Cerro says the former Uruguay Stints followed in the NSW State League for Bonnyrigg White Eagles (formerly Avala) and Marconi Stallions for a record NSL transfer at the time under manager Frank Arok. He is remembered for a brilliant solo goal dribbling and scoring outside the 18 yard-box against South Melbourne.

A move to West Adelaide Sharks followed consolidating a first team spot and performed brilliantly with teammates and fellow countrymen Pablo Cardozo and José Iriarte under manager Raúl Blanco. Fondly remembered at the South Australian capital, enjoying two full seasons.

In 1995, out of match fitness for four months, he was transferred to Pahang FC in the Malaysian Super League which was to be his first taste overseas. Joining José Iriarte and former Socceroo Alan Davidson, his time at Pahang featured a Piala or Malaysia Cup 1–0 final loss to Selangor featuring fellow Australian international Mehmet Durakovic.

He returned to Australia, signing for the Canberra Cosmos for a short stint before moving back to Malaysia where he left a good impression and joining Negeri Sembilan FC in 1996 for four seasons. His second stay in Malaysia did include a brief stint with Melbourne Knights in 1998 before rejoining his club in Malaysia where he partnered countryman José Iriarte where they had previously played together at West Adelaide. Cerro's fourth season in 2000 featured a 2-0 Cup final loss to Perak at the Shah Alam Stadium in Selangor.

Gus is father of musician Montaigne.

References

Association football midfielders
Living people
1969 births
Argentine emigrants to Australia
Australian expatriate soccer players
Footballers from Rosario, Santa Fe
National Soccer League (Australia) players
Negeri Sembilan FC players
Negeri Sembilan FA players
West Adelaide SC players
Parramatta FC players
Australian soccer players